TXL may refer to:

 TXL (programming language)
 Berlin Tegel Airport, defunct German airport (by IATA code)
 Fictional computer in the Today's Special animated series